Spain participated in the Eurovision Song Contest 2016 with the song "Say Yay!" written by Bárbara Reyzábal, Rubén Villanueva and Víctor Púa Vivó. The song was performed by Barei. The Spanish broadcaster Televisión Española (TVE) organised the national final Objetivo Eurovisión in order to select the Spanish entry for the 2016 contest in Stockholm, Sweden. Six artists and songs competed in the televised show where an in-studio jury, an international jury and a public televote selected "Say Yay!" performed by Barei as the winner.

As a member of the "Big Five", Spain automatically qualified to compete in the final of the Eurovision Song Contest. Performing in position 19, Spain placed twenty-second out of the 26 participating countries with 77 points.

Background 

The nation has won the contest on two occasions: in 1968 with the song "La, la, la" performed by Massiel and in 1969 with the song "Vivo cantando" performed by Salomé, the latter having won in a four-way tie with France, the Netherlands and the United Kingdom. Spain has also finished second four times, with Karina in 1971, Mocedades in 1973, Betty Missiego in 1979 and Anabel Conde in 1995. In 2015, Spain placed twenty-first with the song "Amanecer" performed by Edurne.

The Spanish national broadcaster, Televisión Española (TVE), broadcasts the event within Spain and organises the selection process for the nation's entry. TVE confirmed their intentions to participate at the 2016 Eurovision Song Contest on 14 September 2015. In 2015, TVE selected both the artist and song that would compete at the Eurovision Song Contest via an internal selection. For their 2016 entry, the broadcaster announced on 18 December 2015 that it would organise a national final similar in format to the one used previously in 2014, which featured a competition among several artists and songs.

Before Eurovision

Objetivo Eurovisión
Objetivo Eurovisión was the national final organised by TVE that took place on 1 February 2016 at the Adisar Studios in Villaviciosa de Odón, Community of Madrid, hosted by Anne Igartiburu with Julia Varela acting as the green room host. The show was broadcast on La 1 as well as online via TVE's official website rtve.es and the official Eurovision Song Contest website eurovision.tv. Six artists and songs competed with the winner being decided upon through a combination of public televoting, an in-studio expert jury and an international jury. The national final was watched by 1.669 million viewers in Spain with a market share of 9.1%. The international jury consisted of television, radio and music professionals selected by the following broadcasters that are part of the European Broadcasting Union: France Télévisions (France), RAI (Italy), SVT (Sweden) and BBC (United Kingdom). The three members of the in-studio jury that evaluated the entries during the final were:
Loreen – Singer, music producer, winner of the Eurovision Song Contest 2012 for Sweden
Edurne – Singer, actress, television presenter, represented Spain in the 2015 contest
Carlos Marín – Baritone, member of classical crossover group Il Divo

Competing entries
On 18 December 2015, TVE invited the Spanish public to propose their ideal candidates for the national final by using the hashtag #euroapuesta in their social media posts. The most popular proposals were Xuso Jones, Raúl Gómez and Maverick. Among female performers, the most popular were María Isabel, Eva Ruiz, María Villalón and Lorena Gómez. Former national final participants Brequette, Coral Segovia and Jorge González were also among the recommendations. The six competing acts were announced on 29 December 2015 via TVE's official website and social media platforms. Among the competing artists was María Isabel who won the Junior Eurovision Song Contest 2004 for Spain with the song "Antes muerta que sencilla". 30-second clips of the competing songs were previewed by TVE on their official website on 19 January 2016, while the songs in their entirety were premiered a day later on 20 January on a special webcast show, presented by Irene Mahía and with three of the candidates (Electric Nana, Maverick and Salvador Beltrán) as guests, that was also broadcast on TVE's official website.

Final
The televised final took place on 1 February 2016. The running order for the six participating entries was determined during a press conference held at Prado del Rey in Pozuelo de Alarcón (Madrid) on 28 January 2016. The winner, "Say Yay!" performed by Barei, was selected through the combination of the votes of an in-studio jury (30%), the votes of an international jury (30%) and a public televote (40%). "Say Yay!" is the first song performed entirely in the English language that was selected to represent Spain at the Eurovision Song Contest. In addition to the performances of the competing entries, guest performers included former national final participants Brequette, Jorge González, Coral Segovia and Mirela, and former Eurovision contestants Loreen, Edurne and the group D'Nash which represented Spain in 2007.

Preparation
The official video of the song, directed by Gus Carballo, was filmed in February 2016 in different locations in Madrid, mainly in a tunnel at Las Tablas neighbourhood, and also features scenes filmed in Barcelona, Berlin, Havana, London, Miami and Stockholm. The video premiered on 10 March 2016 on RTVE's website. The music video served as the official preview video for the Spanish entry.

Promotion
Barei made several appearances across Europe to specifically promote "Say Yay!" as the Spanish Eurovision entry. On 13 February, Barei performed "Say Yay! during the second semi-final of the Ukrainian Eurovision national final. On 2 April, she performed "Say Yay!" at the Eurovision Pre-Party in Riga, Latvia, held at the Spikeri Concert Hall. On 3 April, she performed during the Eurovision Pre-Party in Moscow, Russia, held at the Izvestyia Hall and hosted by Dmitry Guberniev. On 9 April, Barei performed during the Eurovision in Concert event which was held at the Melkweg venue in Amsterdam, Netherlands and hosted by Cornald Maas and Hera Björk. She was confirmed to perform the song at the Israel Calling in Tel Aviv, Israel on 12 April, but she withdrew from the event due to "production delays". On 17 April, Barei performed during the London Eurovision Party, which was held at the Café de Paris venue in London, United Kingdom and hosted by Nicki French and Paddy O'Connell.

In addition to her international appearances, she performed the song on the morning show La mañana on La 1 on 3 February. On 5 March, Barei performed an acoustic version of "Say Yay!" at the El Intruso club in Madrid as a part of the city's Ellas Son-Arte festival. On 29 March, Barei performed an acoustic version of the song during the #0 talk show programme Likes. On 28 April, a farewell party was held for Barei before she travelled to Stockholm for the contest, which took place at the Swedish Embassy in Madrid, hosted by Ambassador Cecilia Julin. On 29 April, she performed during a Spanish Eurovision party, which took place at the Palacio de la Prensa in Madrid, hosted by Julia Varela.

At Eurovision 

According to Eurovision rules, all nations with the exceptions of the host country and the "Big Five" (France, Germany, Italy, Spain and the United Kingdom) are required to qualify from one of two semi-finals in order to compete for the final; the top ten countries from each semi-final progress to the final. As a member of the "Big Five", Spain automatically qualified to compete in the final on 14 May 2016. In addition to their participation in the final, Spain is also required to broadcast and vote in one of the two semi-finals. During the semi-final allocation draw on 25 January 2016, Spain was assigned to broadcast and vote in the first semi-final on 10 May 2016.

In Spain, the semi-finals were broadcast on La 2 and the final was broadcast on La 1 with commentary by José María Íñigo and Julia Varela. The Spanish spokesperson, who announced the top 12-point score awarded by the Spanish jury during the final, was Jota Abril.

Final

Barei took part in technical rehearsals on 6 and 8 May, followed by dress rehearsals on 9, 13 and 14 May. This included the semi-final jury show on 9 May where an extended clip of the Spanish performance was filmed for broadcast during the live show on 10 May and the jury final on 13 May where the professional juries of each country watched and voted on the competing entries. During the opening ceremony festivities that took place on 8 May, Barei took part in a draw to determine in which half of the final the Spanish entry would be performed. Spain was drawn to compete in the second half. Following the conclusion of the second semi-final, the shows' producers decided upon the running order of the final. The running order for the semi-finals and final was decided by the shows' producers rather than through another draw, so that similar songs were not placed next to each other. Spain was subsequently placed to perform in position 19, following the entry from Russia and before the entry from Latvia.

The Spanish performance featured Barei on stage wearing a golden bronze dress, joined by four backing vocalists wearing black dresses; an additional off-stage backing vocalist was also part of the performance. The stage lighting and LED screens displayed neon colours and geometric shapes. Barei began the performance on the main stage and did a dance routine with her backing vocalists before walking down the catwalk and finishing the song on the satellite stage. During the performance, Barei fell down; the incorporation of the move was explained by the singer during a press conference: "We thought about it when recording the music video, like I'm talking about failure and not throwing the towel. You need to go for your dreams and failure can come any time, you don't know when, and this fall on stage is a symbol, that it could happen right there." The stage director for the performance was Florian Boje with choreography completed by Laura García. The five backing vocalists that joined Barei were Rebeca Rods, Milena Brody, Alana Sinkëy, Awinnie MyBaby and Brequette. Rods was a backing vocalist for Spain in 2007 and 2012, Brody was a backing vocalist in 2013, Sinkëy and MyBaby were backing vocalists in 2014, while Brequette was the runner-up in the 2014 Spanish national final. Spain placed twenty-second in the final, scoring 77 points: 10 points from the televoting and 67 points from the juries.

Voting
Voting during the three shows was conducted under a new system that involved each country now awarding two sets of points from 1-8, 10 and 12: one from their professional jury and the other from televoting. Each nation's jury consisted of five music industry professionals who are citizens of the country they represent, with their names published before the contest to ensure transparency. This jury judged each entry based on: vocal capacity; the stage performance; the song's composition and originality; and the overall impression by the act. In addition, no member of a national jury was permitted to be related in any way to any of the competing acts in such a way that they cannot vote impartially and independently. The individual rankings of each jury member as well as the nation's televoting results were released shortly after the grand final.

Below is a breakdown of points awarded to Spain and awarded by Spain in the first semi-final and grand final of the contest, and the breakdown of the jury voting and televoting conducted during the two shows:

Points awarded to Spain

Points awarded by Spain

Detailed voting results
The following members comprised the Spanish jury:
  (Electric Nana; jury chairperson)songwriter, artist
 songwriter, artist 
  (Maverick)singer
 Jesús Segovia Pérez (Xuso Jones)musician, composer, artist, producer
 singer

References

External links

 Official TVE Eurovision website

2016
Countries in the Eurovision Song Contest 2016
Eurovision
Eurovision